Syarhey Kazeka (born 17 August 1986) is a Belarusian footballer coach and former player.

Honours
Gomel
Belarusian Cup winner: 2010–11
Belarusian Super Cup winner: 2012

Minsk
Belarusian Cup winner: 2012–13

Spartaks Jūrmala
Latvian Higher League champion: 2016, 2017

External links
 
 
 Profile at FC Gomel website

1986 births
Living people
Belarusian footballers
Association football midfielders
Belarusian expatriate footballers
Expatriate footballers in Latvia
FC Baranovichi players
FC Gomel players
FC Minsk players
FC Torpedo-BelAZ Zhodino players
FC Shakhtyor Soligorsk players
FK Spartaks Jūrmala players
FC Uzda players
FC Krumkachy Minsk players
Belarusian football managers
FC Krumkachy Minsk managers
People from Baranavichy
Sportspeople from Brest Region